Bagatelle was a gourmet restaurant in the borough Frogner in Oslo, Norway.

Until 2012, it was the only Norwegian restaurant that has held two stars in the Michelin guide. The restaurant lost one of its stars in 2008, though was restored as a two-star restaurant in March 2009. In the 2011 Michelin Guide Bagatelle had zero stars, but regained a star in 2012.

The restaurant was formerly led by the chef Eyvind Hellstrøm, and is owned 95% by Christen Sveaas through the Norwegian company AS Holding. Bagatelle lies in Bygdøy Allé 3, and has been situated there since 1932. Originally, the building housed a restaurant run by the family Jacques under the name Jacques Bagatelle. Hellstrøm has run the restaurant in its current form since 1982, until he announced in December 2009 he would be leaving the restaurant due to a long term conflict with Sveaas.

The menu is "Norwegian- French cuisine with an emphasis on Norwegian products and modern cooking techniques inspired by developments in France. Bagatelle served the Mauboussin Mega Sundae, which was listed as one of the most expensive ice creams in the world.

Bagatelle closed in September 2014 after having operated at a loss for several years.

References
6_today l had my lovely lunch at Bagatelle in Barasov..it was really very tasty .the grediants smell open my appetite to order another course.Actually the chief Andrea is an artist in making nicely presentation of tasty.

External links

 Bagatelle official site 

Defunct French restaurants
Restaurants in Oslo
Michelin Guide starred restaurants in Norway
1982 establishments in Norway
Restaurants established in 1982
Defunct restaurants in Norway